KAZA-TV (channel 54) is a television station licensed to Avalon, California, United States, serving the Los Angeles area as an owned-and-operated station of the classic television network MeTV. It is owned by Weigel Broadcasting alongside Bishop-licensed KVME-TV (channel 20) and low-power Class A MeTV+ station KHTV-CD (channel 6), Ontario-licensed  Decades outlet KPOM-CD (channel 14), and Jewelry Television affiliate KSFV-CD (channel 27). KAZA-TV's studios are located on Grand Central Avenue in Glendale, and its transmitter is located at the Mount Harvard Radio Site in the San Gabriel Mountains. KAZA-TV's primary channel is separate from the MeTV feed on the third digital subchannel of Anaheim-licensed independent station KDOC-TV (channel 56).

Even though KAZA-TV is licensed as a full-power station, its broadcasting radius does not reach all of Greater Los Angeles as it shares spectrum with KHTV-CD. Therefore, it must rely on cable and satellite carriage to reach the entire market.

History

The station first signed on the air on July 9, 2001, originally operating as an independent station, carrying a format of Spanish-language music videos temporarily until the launch of Azteca América on July 28. The station was founded by Visalia-based Pappas Telecasting (which initially held a 75% majority stake in the station, which expanded to 80% in 2014) and TV Azteca (which owned the remaining interest).

On November 30, 2006, NBC Universal (owner of rival KVEA, channel 52 and then-owner of KWHY, channel 22) filed a petition with the Federal Communications Commission (FCC) to deny KAZA's license renewal, on basis that TV Azteca controlled 51.6% of the station (above the FCC-designated 33% interest limit for foreign owned broadcasters) via loans and other interests. According to the Los Angeles Times, it is believed to be the first challenge to a license renewal sent to the FCC since 1979 (notwithstanding the two-decade long RKO General license challenges including KHJ-TV that were not fully sorted until the late 1980s).

According to the filing, NBC Universal accused TV Azteca of attempting to undermine its operations in Mexico. One example cited is the shutdown of production of the Telemundo program Quinceañera. NBC Universal accused TV Azteca of hiring undercover police officers to enforce the shutdown; the show's production was moved to Miami as a result. Two days later, Azteca chairman, Luis Echarte, insisted that the local marketing agreement is legitimate and called NBC Universal's allegations "ridiculous", citing that: "It's obviously a ploy to damage our image, given our strong performance in the U.S.," he says. "KAZA is owned by Pappas. We’ve been paying rent to Pappas to operate the station for three years."

On September 8, 2017, Pappas Telecasting and TV Azteca announced they would sell KAZA to Chicago-based Weigel Broadcasting for $9 million. On January 1, 2018, KJLA (channel 57) replaced KAZA as the Azteca America affiliate for the Los Angeles market. Weigel Broadcasting assumed operational responsibilities for KAZA as well as ownership of its license on January 3, 2018, and converted into an owned-and-operated station of Weigel-owned MeTV as "MeTV Los Angeles". Prior to the switch, the MeTV affiliation was split between the DT3 feed of Anaheim-based KDOC-TV (channel 56) and Bishop-based KVME-TV (channel 20). KVME became an affiliate of MeTV's sister network, Heroes & Icons on January 15, 2018.

On August 31, 2018, Decades soft-launched on KAZA-DT2, ahead of it moving three days later officially from KCBS-DT2 to launch fellow Weigel network Start TV.

On February 28, 2022, subchannel 54.2 was upgraded to 720p high definition. On May 26, 2022, Story Television moved to 54.2, with Decades moving to KPOM-CD 14.1.

Technical information

Subchannels
The station's digital signal is multiplexed:

Analog-to-digital conversion
KAZA-TV shut down its analog signal, over UHF channel 54, on June 12, 2009, as part of the federally mandated transition from analog to digital television. The station's digital signal remained on its pre-transition UHF channel 47, using PSIP to display KAZA-TV's virtual channel as 54 on digital television receivers, which was among the high band UHF channels (52-69) that were removed from broadcasting use as a result of the transition.

References

External links

AZA-TV
Television channels and stations established in 2001
MeTV affiliates
Decades (TV network) affiliates
2001 establishments in California
Weigel Broadcasting